Miège is a municipality in the district of Sierre in the canton of Valais in Switzerland. 

Miège or Miege may also refer to:

People
 Guy Miege (1644–after 1718), English author and lexicographer who plagiarised a work by Edward Chamberlayne
 John Baptist Miège (1815-1884), American Jesuit prelate and missionary
 Bernard Miège (b. 1941), French media theorist

Other
 Bishop Miege High School, American Catholic high school

See also
 Mièges, a commune in eastern France